Sanilac County is a county located in the Thumb region of the U.S. state of Michigan. As of the 2020 Census, the population was 40,611. The county seat is Sandusky. The county was created on September 10, 1822, and was fully organized on December 31, 1849. Sanilac County is considered to be part of the Thumb of Michigan, a subregion of the Flint/Tri-Cities. Sanilac County enjoys seasonal tourism in towns such as Lexington, Port Sanilac, and Carsonville. Sanilac County is economically attached to St. Clair County and Huron County and is largely composed of nearly flat areas of rich soil.

History

Sanilac County was probably named for a Wyandot (Huron) chief named Sanilac. (See List of Michigan county name etymologies). The county was formed on September 10, 1822, by the Michigan Territorial Legislature, partitioning parts of St. Clair County and unorganized territory administered by Oakland County. The original boundary of the county was reduced in 1840, when parts were partitioned off to create Huron and Tuscola counties. The county government was fully organized on December 31, 1849.
In the middle of the 19th century, the area now called Port Sanilac was called Bark Shanty. It was named for a lone shanty made of bark, which was used to make shingles from pine. The county seat of Sanilac is the city of Sandusky.

Geography

Adjacent counties
 Huron County  (north)
 Tuscola County  (west)
 St. Clair County  (south)
 Lapeer County  (southwest)
 Huron County, Ontario, Canada (east)

Major highways

Demographics

The 2010 United States Census indicates Sanilac County had a 2010 population of 43,114. This decrease of -1,433 people from the 2000 United States Census represents a 3.2% population loss in the decade. In 2010 there were 17,132 households and 11,885 families in the county. The population density was 44.8 per square mile (17.3 per km2). There were 22,725 housing units at an average density of 23.6 per square mile (9.1 per km2). 96.6% of the population were White, 0.5% Native American, 0.3% Black or African American, 0.3% Asian, 1.1% of some other race and 1.2% of two or more races. 3.3% were Hispanic or Latino (of any race). 26.1% were of German, 11.0% Polish, 10.4% English, 8.3% Irish, 7.2% American and 5.1% French, French Canadian or Cajun ancestry.

There were 17,132 households, out of which 29.2% had children under the age of 18 living with them, 55.3% were husband and wife families, 9.8% had a female householder with no husband present, 30.6% were non-families, and 26.4% were made up of individuals. The average household size was 2.48 and the average family size was 2.97.

In the county, the population was spread out, with 23.6% under age of 18, 7.4% from 18 to 24, 21.8% from 25 to 44, 29.6% from 45 to 64, and 17.6% who were 65 years of age or older. The median age was 43 years. For every 100 females there were 97.8 males. For every 100 females age 18 and over, there were 96.7 males.

The 2010 American Community Survey 3-year estimate indicates the median income for a household in the county was $39,138 and the median income for a family was $47,885. Males had a median income of $27,440 versus $16,509 for females. The per capita income for the county was $19,671. About 1.5% of families and 16.1% of the population were below the poverty line, including 23.3% of those under the age 18 and 11.4% of those age 65 or over.

Religion
 The Roman Catholic Diocese of Saginaw is the controlling regional body for the Catholic Church.

Government
Sanilac County has voted for the Republican nominee in every presidential election since the GOP's inaugural election in 1856 -- except in 1912, when the county supported Theodore Roosevelt's Bull Moose Party campaign. However, they had voted for the Republican nominee in 1912, William Howard Taft in the previous election (1908). Hence, every person who has won the GOP's nomination has won Sanilac County, Michigan. Theodore Roosevelt had also been the Republican nominee in 1904.

The county government operates the jail, maintains rural roads, operates the major local courts, records deeds, mortgages, and vital records, administers public health regulations, and participates with the state in the provision of social services. The county board of commissioners controls the budget and has limited authority to make laws or ordinances. In Michigan, most local government functions — police and fire, building and zoning, tax assessment, street maintenance, etc. — are the responsibility of individual cities and townships.

Elected officials

 Prosecuting Attorney: James V. Young
 Sheriff: Paul Rich
 County Clerk: Denise McGuire
 County Treasurer: Trudy M. Nicol
 Register of Deeds: Michele VanNorman
 Drain Commissioner: Gregory L Alexander
 Circuit Court Judge: Hon. Donald A. Teeple
 Probate Court Judge: Hon. Gregory S. Ross
 District Court Judge: Hon. Gregory S Ross
 Commissioner – Dist 1: Jon Block
 Commissioner – Dist 2: Gary Heberling
 Commissioner – Dist 3: William Sarkella
 Commissioner – Dist 4: Bob Colely
 Commissioner – Dist 5: Paul Muxlow

Media
 Sanilac/GB Broadcasting operates three radio stations in Sanilac County.
 The county is served weekly by the Tribune-Recorder since 1893, the Sanilac County News of Sandusky and other small newspapers.
 Daily deliveries of the Port Huron Times Herald are available in Sanilac County.

Communities

Cities
 Brown City
 Croswell
 Marlette
 Sandusky (county seat)

Villages

 Applegate
 Carsonville
 Deckerville
 Forestville
 Lexington
 Melvin
 Minden City
 Peck
 Port Sanilac

Census-designated place
 Snover

Other unincorporated communities

 Amadore
 Argyle
 Austin Center
 Birch Beach
 Blue Water Beach
 Cash
 Charleston
 Cumber
 Decker
 Downington
 Elmer
 Freidberger
 Great Lakes Beach
 Huronia Heights
 Juhl
 Laing
 Lexington Heights
 McGregor
 Omard
 Palms
 Tyre
 Watertown

Townships

 Argyle Township
 Austin Township
 Bridgehampton Township
 Buel Township
 Custer Township
 Delaware Township
 Elk Township
 Elmer Township
 Evergreen Township
 Flynn Township
 Forester Township
 Fremont Township
 Greenleaf Township
 Lamotte Township
 Lexington Township
 Maple Valley Township
 Marion Township
 Marlette Township
 Minden Township
 Moore Township
 Sanilac Township
 Speaker Township
 Washington Township
 Watertown Township
 Wheatland Township
 Worth Township

See also
 List of Michigan State Historic Sites in Sanilac County, Michigan
 National Register of Historic Places listings in Sanilac County, Michigan

References

Further reading

External links
 Sanilac County

 
Michigan counties
1848 establishments in Michigan
Populated places established in 1848